The Ministry of Education is the Maldivian government sector responsible for education and providing public schools with funding necessary for the education institution.

The Ministry Of Education directs the formulation and implementation of education policies. It has control of the development and administration of the Government and Government-aided primary schools, secondary schools, junior colleges, and a centralized institute. It also registers private schools.
It was introduced in 1965 shortly after the Independence of Maldives from the British. The Maldivian education system was revolutionized after the introduction of the MOE.

A survey of Maldives Schools in 1992 showed that the total number of pupils in Maldives was 73,642 and the number of government and private schools were 32,475 and 41,167 respectively.

References

Education in the Maldives
Government of the Maldives
Government ministries of the Maldives
1965 establishments in the Maldives